The Pilgrimage Church of Wies is an oval Rococo church, designed in the late 1740s by brothers J. B. and Dominikus Zimmermann, the latter of whom lived nearby for the last eleven years of his life. It is located in the foothills of the Alps, in the municipality of Steingaden in the Weilheim-Schongau district, Bavaria, Germany. Because of its outstanding rococo architecture, the Wieskirche was added to the UNESCO World Heritage List in 1983.

History and Description 
It is said that, in 1738, tears were seen on a dilapidated wooden figure of the Scourged Saviour. The legend of this miracle resulted in a pilgrimage rush to see the sculpture. In 1740, a small chapel was built to house the statue but it was soon realized that the building would be too small for the number of pilgrims it attracted, and so Steingaden Abbey decided to commission a separate shrine. Construction took place between 1745 and 1754, and the interior was decorated with frescoes and with stuccowork in the tradition of the Wessobrunner School. "Everything was done throughout the church to make the supernatural visible. Sculpture and murals combined to unleash the divine in visible form". 

There is a popular belief that the Bavarian government planned to sell or demolish the rococo masterpiece during the secularization of Bavaria at the beginning of the 19th century, and that only protests from the local farmers saved it from destruction. Available sources, however, document that the responsible state commission clearly advocated the continuation of Wies as a pilgrimage site, even in spite of economic objections from the abbot of Steingaden. Many who have prayed in front of the statue of Jesus on the altar have claimed that people have been miraculously cured of their diseases, which has made this church even more of a pilgrimage site. The church underwent extensive restoration between 1985 and 1991.

The Wieskirche has an oval plan, with a semi-circular narthex. Inside, twin columns in front of the walls support the elaborate cornice, with elaborate stucco decorations (painted by J. B. Zimmerman) and a long, deep choir. The ceilings are painted in a trompe-l'œil style, appearing to open up to an iridescent sky.

See also
 History of early modern period domes

Notes

External links

 Wieskirche: home page
Pilgrimage Church of Wies UNESCO Official Website

Roman Catholic churches in Bavaria
World Heritage Sites in Germany
Roman Catholic churches completed in 1754
Landmarks in Germany
Pilgrimage churches in Germany
Rococo architecture in Germany
Registered historic buildings and monuments in Bavaria
1754 establishments in the Holy Roman Empire
18th-century establishments in Bavaria
Weilheim-Schongau
18th-century Roman Catholic church buildings in Germany